Shanmugasundari (23 September 1937 – 1 May 2012) was a Tamil actress. she acted in more than 750 films.  Her daughter T. K. Kala is also an actress and playback singer. She also appeared in comedy roles along with Vadivelu in many films.

Career
Shanmugasundari started her stage performances at the age of 5. She survived nearly 45 years in the film industry and did more than 750 films. She was also a dubbing artist. She also acted in comedy roles, especially as a mother of Vadivelu in many films. Shanmugasundari acted along with M. G. Ramachandran in Idhayakkani, Neerum Neruppum, Kannan en Kadhalan and En Annan. In Lakshmi Kalyanam and Vadivukku Valaikaappu along with Sivaji Ganeshan and Malathi, along with Gemini Ganeshan. Shanmugasundari received the Kalaimamani Award from Tamil Nadu Government for her best acting in dramas roles 1982 - 1983.

Personal life
Shanmugasundari has 5 daughters named T. K. Kala, Neela, Mala, Meena and Selvi. Among them, T. K. Kala is a playback singer and also an actress.

Death
Due to illness, Shanmugasundari was admitted to the hospital and died on 1 May 2012 Morning 4.30 AM .  She was 74.

Filmography
This is a partial filmography. You can expand it.

Television
 2002-2005 Metti Oli as Kamatchi (House Owner Paati)
 2003-2004 Kolangal as Sundar's mother
 2004-2006 Ahalya

References

2012 deaths
Tamil actresses
Actresses from Tamil Nadu
Indian Tamil people
Tamil comedians
1937 births
Indian women comedians
20th-century Indian actresses